Nether Hall is a large mansion in Doncaster. It is a Grade II listed building.

History
The building was designed as a mansion for the Copley family of Sprotbrough and was completed in the early to mid 18th century. It became a private school in the 1870s and then became the headquarters of the Queen's Own Yorkshire Dragoons in the early 20th century. The regiment was mobilised at Nether Hall in August 1914 before being deployed to the Western Front. The hall was decommissioned after the war and acquired by Doncaster Rural District Council in 1921; a rear wing was built for use as a council chamber. Following the Local Government Act 1974 the hall was used to accommodate the finance department of the Metropolitan Borough of Doncaster. After the finance department moved to new civic offices in Sir Nigel Gresley Square in 2013, Nether Hall was sold at auction for £410,000 in 2014.

References

Buildings and structures in Doncaster
Drill halls in England
Grade II listed buildings in South Yorkshire